Camp Carlisle (1861 - 1864), 
A Union Army training camp from 1861 to 1864.  It was located on Wheeling Island in the Ohio River at what is now Zane and North Wabash Streets in Wheeling, West Virginia.  It was renamed Camp Willey later in the Civil War.

External links
  West Virginia Timeline of The Civil War  Camp Carlisle on Wheeling Island During The Civil War Contemporary Map locating Camp Carlisle / Camp Willey on the Island in relation to Wheeling, West Virginia and satellite map showing the location.

American Civil War army posts
1861 establishments in Virginia